Majda Milak (born 26 March 1977) is a Serbian rhythmic gymnast. As a 15-year-old girl, she competed as an Independent Olympic Participant at the 1992 Summer Olympics in Barcelona.

External links
Majda Milak - Sports-Reference.com

1977 births
Living people
Serbian rhythmic gymnasts
Olympic gymnasts as Independent Olympic Participants
Gymnasts at the 1992 Summer Olympics